Sean Culkin (born June 11, 1993) is an American football tight end who is a free agent. He played college football at Missouri.

Early years and education
Culkin played high school football at Indian Rocks Christian School in Largo, Florida. He caught 28 passes for 547 yards and 8 touchdowns his junior season, earning All-County honors. He caught 55 passes for 981 yards and 18 touchdowns his senior year, garnering U.S. Air Force First Team All-American, First Team All-State and team MVP recognition. Culkin also played several years of AAU basketball.

He graduated from University of Missouri in May 2016 with a Bachelor's Degree in Finance. In 2020, Culkin was accepted into the Kelley School of Business, where he is currently enrolled in Indiana University's Master of Business Administration program.

College career
Culkin played for the Missouri Tigers of the University of Missouri from 2013 to 2016. He was redshirted in 2012. He played in 14 games in 2013, catching 1 pass for 6 yards and recording 1 solo tackle. Culkin was also named to the SEC Fall Academic Honor Roll. 

He played in 14 games, in 2014, catching 20 passes for 174 yards and 1 touchdown. He played in 10 games, in 2015, catching 16 passes for 139 yards and 1 touchdown. Culkin also recorded one solo tackle. He was named to the SEC Fall Academic Honor Roll in 2015. He played in 10 games in 2016, catching 24 passes for 282 yards. 

Culkin was named to the SEC Fall Academic Honor Roll in 2016. He played in 48 games during his college career, catching 61 passes for 601 yards and 2 touchdowns. He also recorded 2 solo tackles. 

In January 2017, Culkin played in the Tropical Bowl, a college football all-star game.

Professional career
Culkin was rated the 39th best tight end in the 2017 NFL Draft by NFLDraftScout.com.

Los Angeles Chargers
Culkin signed with the Los Angeles Chargers as an undrafted free agent on May 12, 2017.

Culkin was primarily utilized as a blocking tight end and special teams contributor. In his second season with the team, Culkin saw an increase in snaps and 10 starts in the 13 games he played.

In Week 4 of the 2019 season, Culkin suffered a torn Achilles and was ruled out for the season.

Baltimore Ravens
On September 22, 2020, Culkin was signed to the Baltimore Ravens practice squad. He was elevated to the active roster on December 2 for the team's week 12 game against the Pittsburgh Steelers, and reverted to the practice squad after the game. He was placed on the practice squad/injured list on December 4, and restored to the practice squad on January 5, 2021. His practice squad contract with the team expired after the season on January 25, 2021.

Kansas City Chiefs
On February 5, 2021, Culkin signed a reserve/future contract with the Kansas City Chiefs. On April 26, 2021, he became the first NFL player to convert his entire salary to bitcoin. He was released on May 10, 2021.

References

External links
Los Angeles Chargers bio
Missouri Tigers bio
College stats

1993 births
Living people
American football tight ends
Baltimore Ravens players
Kansas City Chiefs players
Los Angeles Chargers players
Missouri Tigers football players
Players of American football from Florida
Sportspeople from Pinellas County, Florida